FC Kyran (Qyran fýtbol klýby) is a Kazakhstani football club based in Shymkent.

History
The club was formed in 2011 and finished 11th in its first season in the Kazakhstan First Division.

League and cup history

References

Association football clubs established in 2011
Football clubs in Kazakhstan
2011 establishments in Kazakhstan